Avraham "Abie" Nathan (29 April 1927 – 27 August 2008) was an Israeli humanitarian and peace activist. He founded the Voice of Peace radio station. When he died the president of Israel Shimon Peres said about him: "He was one of the most prominent and special people in the country... He is the man who dedicated his life for other people and for a better humanity."

Early years
Abie Nathan was born to a Jewish family in Abadan, Persia, on 29 April 1927 and spent his adolescent years in Bombay (now Mumbai), India. He became a pilot in the Royal Air Force in 1944. In 1948 he volunteered as a pilot in the Machal (volunteers in the 1948 Arab-Israeli War) and stayed in Israel thereafter. He worked for El Al airlines and later opened a restaurant in Tel Aviv.

Flight for Peace

Nathan led a party called Nes (Miracle) in the 1965 Knesset elections, but failed to cross the electoral threshold. After the results were published, he declared that he would fly to Egypt in his plane, which he named Shalom 1 ("Peace 1"), carrying a message of peace. He landed in Port Said on 28 February 1966, where he was arrested. He asked to meet Egyptian President Gamal Abdel Nasser to deliver a petition calling for peace between Israel and Egypt. He was refused and deported back to Israel, where he was arrested again for leaving the country by an illegal route.

Meetings with PLO
In 1978, Nathan began his first hunger strike to protest against the construction of Israeli settlements. In the early 1980s, he began meeting officials from the Palestine Liberation Organization (PLO). These meetings were later outlawed by the Knesset. In 1991, Nathan went on another hunger strike for 40 days to protest against that law, which prevented meetings with alleged terrorist organizations. He stopped his hunger strike after President Chaim Herzog intervened. Nathan continued to meet with PLO head Yasser Arafat, however, and on 18 September 1991 he was sentenced to 18 months in prison. Herzog cut 12 months from the sentence, and Nathan was released after serving less than 6 months.

Voice of Peace and humanitarian activities
 

In 1973, Nathan founded the Voice of Peace radio station. He bought a ship with the help of John Lennon, named it the "Peace Ship", and sailed it outside Israeli territorial waters. The station broadcast 24 hours a day, mostly English-language programs that mainly included popular music, while promoting Nathan's political activities. At the same time, he was involved with disaster relief in Cambodia, Bangladesh, Biafra, Colombia, and Ethiopia. In another anti-war protest, he presided over the burial of smashed military toys.

Nathan founded, at the beginning of 1980, "Abie’s Angels" – an Organisation of volunteers that helped each other when needed. In August of that year, together with the non-political movement for quality of life and society in Israel Am Yafe Am Ehad (One Beautiful People One Nation) he set up a trust for the elderly named "Keren Sevá Tová" (a ripe old age) that provided clothes and household ware to old people in need. At the end of that year he received an award from the Knesset (Israeli parliament) for setting up a social lobby for the elderly.

On 1 October 1993, economic and legal difficulties forced Nathan to close the Voice of Peace station. One of the reasons for closing was that, with the signing of the Oslo Peace Accords, Nathan felt that his message for peace and dialogue between Israelis and Palestinians had been spread. The Peace Ship was scuttled on 28 November 1993.

Sickness, death and tributes

In 1997, Nathan suffered a stroke that left him partially paralyzed. He died in Tel Aviv on 27 August 2008 at age 81. On 10 June 2007 the Tel Aviv-Yafo municipality passed a resolution to post a commemorative plaque on the Tel Aviv boardwalk at Gordon Beach, opposite where the Peace Ship had been anchored. This memorial plays recordings of the Voice of Peace, including the station callsign in Nathan's voice and an explanation in both Hebrew and English.

See also
 List of peace activists
 Mathias Rust

References

External links 
 Abie Nathan website
 Who's Abie Nathan? Soundscapes
 Peres: Woe to us had Nathan listened to consensus, Cyprus Observer
 "Lonely Rider" by Uri Avnery

1927 births
2008 deaths
Israeli humanitarians
Israeli anti-war activists
Israeli Jews
Israeli people of Iranian-Jewish descent
People from Abadan, Iran
Military personnel from Mumbai
People from Tel Aviv
Radio company founders
Restaurant founders
Royal Air Force personnel of World War II
Burials at Kiryat Shaul Cemetery
Iranian expatriates in India
Israeli expatriates in India